The 1945 Monmouth by-election was a by-election held for the British House of Commons constituency of Monmouth in Wales on 31 October 1945.  The seat had become vacant on the death of the sitting Conservative Member of Parliament (MP) Leslie Pym, and the by-election was won by the Conservative candidate Peter Thorneycroft.

Vacancy
The Conservative MP Leslie Pym had died at the age of 61 on 17 July 1945, only 5 days after polling in the 1945 general election, but 9 days before the declaration. He was thus unusually declared elected posthumously. Pym had held the seat since a by-election in 1939.

Previous result

Candidates
The Conservative candidate was 36-year-old Peter Thorneycroft, who had been the MP for Stafford from a 1938 by-election until his defeat at the 1945 general election.

The Labour Party candidate was A. B. L. Oakley, who had been the unsuccessful candidate at the general election in July.

Result
On a significantly reduced turnout, Thorneycroft held the seat for the Conservatives, a narrowly increased majority of 2,139. He held the seat until his defeat at the 1966 general election, serving as a senior Cabinet minister in the government of Harold Macmillan.

See also
Monmouth (UK Parliament constituency)
Monmouth
1934 Monmouth by-election
1939 Monmouth by-election
1991 Monmouth by-election
List of United Kingdom by-elections (1931–1950)

References

By-elections to the Parliament of the United Kingdom in Welsh constituencies
1945 in Wales
1940s elections in Wales
1945 elections in the United Kingdom
Elections in Monmouthshire
History of Monmouth, Wales
20th century in Monmouthshire